Raymond Rasch (March 1, 1917 – December 23, 1964) was a pianist and arranger on the Hollywood scene in the 1950s and 1960s.

Rasch was born in Toledo, Ohio. He won a posthumous Oscar in 1972 for Best Original Music Score for Chaplin's 1952 film Limelight (along with Charlie Chaplin and Larry Russell).

References

1917 births
1964 deaths
Best Original Music Score Academy Award winners
20th-century American pianists
American male pianists
20th-century American male musicians